Kimberly Township is a township in Aitkin County, Minnesota, United States. The population was 195 as of the 2010 census.

History
Kimberly Township was named for Moses C. Kimberly, an official of the Northern Pacific Railway.

Geography

Lakes
 Camp Lake 
 Dam Lake (northwest three-quarters)
 Newstrom Lake

Adjacent townships
 Fleming Township (north)
 Jevne Township (northeast)
 Lee Township (southeast)
 Glen Township (south)
 Nordland Township (southwest)
 Spencer Township (west)

Cemeteries
The township contains the following cemeteries: Anderson, Forest and Howard Private.

Demographics
As of the census of 2000, there were 245 people, 97 households, and 73 families residing in the township.  The population density was 6.8 people per square mile (2.6/km2).  There were 177 housing units at an average density of 4.9/sq mi (1.9/km2).  The racial makeup of the township was 100.00% White.

There were 97 households, out of which 27.8% had children under the age of 18 living with them, 68.0% were married couples living together, 2.1% had a female householder with no husband present, and 24.7% were non-families. 21.6% of all households were made up of individuals, and 9.3% had someone living alone who was 65 years of age or older.  The average household size was 2.53 and the average family size was 2.92.

In the township the population was spread out, with 23.7% under the age of 18, 4.9% from 18 to 24, 20.0% from 25 to 44, 35.1% from 45 to 64, and 16.3% who were 65 years of age or older.  The median age was 46 years. For every 100 females, there were 116.8 males.  For every 100 females age 18 and over, there were 112.5 males.

The median income for a household in the township was $32,500, and the median income for a family was $45,625. Males had a median income of $25,357 versus $20,625 for females. The per capita income for the township was $16,161.  About 10.9% of families and 15.4% of the population were below the poverty line, including 15.6% of those under the age of eighteen and 28.3% of those 65 or over.

References
 United States National Atlas
 United States Census Bureau 2007 TIGER/Line Shapefiles
 United States Board on Geographic Names (GNIS)

Townships in Aitkin County, Minnesota
Townships in Minnesota